The Bodo Evangelical Lutheran Church is a Lutheran church made up of Bodo people, one of the ethnic groups of Assam, India.  It is headquartered in Udalguri district in Assam. The church has 65 congregations in 6 pastorates and membership of 11,510 with 65 native workers and 3 schools.

It is one of the three major Lutheran denominations of northeast India along with the Gossner Evangelical Lutheran Church and the Northern Evangelical Lutheran Church.

References

Lutheran denominations
Evangelical denominations in Asia